John Robert McCrum (born 7 July 1953) is an English writer and editor, holding senior editorial positions at Faber and Faber over seventeen years, followed by a long association with The Observer.

Early life 
The son of Michael William McCrum, a Cambridge educated ancient historian, McCrum was educated at Sherborne School, Corpus Christi College, Cambridge (MA(Cantab)), and the University of Pennsylvania as a Thouron Scholar.

Career 
McCrum was editorial director at Faber & Faber from 1979 to 1989 and editor-in-chief there from 1990 to 1996. He served as literary editor of The Observer for more than ten years. In May 2008 he was appointed associate editor of The Observer.

McCrum is the co-author of The Story of English with William Cran and Robert MacNeil and wrote P. G. Wodehouse: A Life. McCrum's novel Suspicion was published in 1997.

McCrum received an Honorary Doctorate from Heriot-Watt University in 2011.

In August 2017, McCrum's Every Third Thought: On life, death and the endgame was published, taking its title from Shakespeare's play The Tempest. The book was adapted and broadcast as BBC Radio 4's Book of the Week the following month.

Personal life 
In 1995, McCrum suffered a massive stroke. The devastating experience and his recovery is chronicled in My Year Off: Recovering Life After a Stroke. He had been married to Sarah Lyall, an American journalist, for only two months and the book includes diary entries made by his wife. He also became a patron of the UK charity Different Strokes, which provides information and support for younger stroke survivors.

Sarah Lyall, who writes for The New York Times, lived in London from 1995 to 2013 and was the newspaper's London correspondent. She returned to New York with the couple's daughters in 2013; Lyall and McCrum later divorced.

McCrum describes himself as "a confused non-believer".

Bibliography

Fiction 
 In the Secret State. New York: Simon and Schuster, 1980.
 A Loss of Heart. 1982
 The Fabulous Englishman UK: Hamish Hamilton Ltd, 1984.
 Mainland. New York: Knopf, 1991.
 The Psychological Moment. London: Martin Secker & Warburg, 1993.
 Jubilee. New York: Knopf, 1994. 
 Suspicion. New York: Norton, 1997.

Non-fiction 
 The Story of English. New York: Elisabeth Sifton, 1986. (With William Cran and Robert MacNeil) 
 My Year Off: Recovering Life After a Stroke. New York: Norton, 1998.  
 P. G. Wodehouse: A Life. New York: Norton, 2004. 
 Globish: How the English Language Became the World's Language. New York: Norton, 2010. 
 The 100 Best Novels in English. London: Galileo, 2015. 
 Every Third Thought: On Life, Death and the Endgame. London: Picador, 2017. 
 The 100 Best Non Fiction Books of All Time. London: Galileo, 2018.

References

External links 

Living people
People educated at Sherborne School
Alumni of Corpus Christi College, Cambridge
British book editors
Place of birth missing (living people)
British literary editors
1953 births